Enrique Gabriel Meza (born 28 November 1985) is a Paraguayan professional footballer who plays as a defender for Paraguayan Primera División side Guaraní.

Career
Born in Villa Elisa, Meza has played club football in Paraguay, Uruguay, France and Brazil for Sol de América, Nacional, Juventud, Dijon, Olimpia, Sport Recife, Chapecoense and Sportivo Luqueño. In 2016, Meza joined Argentine Primera División side Atlético Tucumán. He made his debut on 8 February in a league match against Racing.

He made his international debut for Paraguay in 2008.

Career statistics
.

Honours 
Olimpia
Paraguayan Primera División: 2011 Clausura

Sport Recife
Copa do Nordeste: 2014
Campeonato Pernambucano: 2014

References

1985 births
Living people
Paraguayan footballers
Paraguayan expatriate footballers
Paraguay international footballers
Paraguay under-20 international footballers
Paraguayan Primera División players
Argentine Primera División players
Campeonato Brasileiro Série A players
Uruguayan Primera División players
Club Sol de América footballers
Club Nacional footballers
Club Olimpia footballers
Sport Club do Recife players
Associação Chapecoense de Futebol players
Juventud de Las Piedras players
Dijon FCO players
Sportivo Luqueño players
Atlético Tucumán footballers
Club Guaraní players
Expatriate footballers in Brazil
Expatriate footballers in Argentina
Expatriate footballers in Uruguay
Expatriate footballers in France
Association football defenders